Anomoeoneidaceae is a family of diatoms belonging to the order Cymbellales.

Genera:
 Adlafia 
 Anomoeoneis
 Dickieia

References

Cymbellales
Diatom families